The M1817 common rifle (also known as Deringer M1817 rifle) was a flintlock muzzle-loaded weapon issued due to the Dept. of Ordnance's order of 1814, produced by Henry Deringer and used from the 1820s to 1840s at the American frontier. Unlike the half octagon barreled M1814 common rifle that preceded it, it had a barrel that was round for most of its length. The 36-inch barrel was rifled for .54 caliber bullets. For rifling it had seven grooves. Like the M1814 common rifle, it had a large oval patch box in the stock, however the stock dropped steeper than on the M1814 common rifle.

After producing the M1814 common rifle through contractors, the military decided to do the same with the M1817 rifle. The Harper's Ferry Arsenal produced a pattern weapon, which was then taken to gunsmiths to be copied.  The rifle was built by Henry Deringer of Philadelphia (13,000 made), Nathan Starr & Co. of Middleton, Conn. (10,200 made), Simeon North of Middleton, Conn. (7,200 made), R. Johnson of Middleton, Conn. (5,000 made), R. & J. D. Johnson of Middleton, Conn. (3,000 made).

Over time the rifles became obsolete, but they still saw service during the American Civil War, originally flintlocks, most were converted to percussion cap for their firing mechanism. They saw service in the west, as far as California, where there were still M1817 rifles in the Bencia, California arsenal in the 1860s.

See also
 Harpers Ferry M1803
 Rifles in the American Civil War

References

Bibliography
 Russel, Carl P., Guns on the early frontiers: A history of firearms from colonial times, University of Nebraska Press, 1980, 395 p.,

External links
 Page with a good picture.

Guns of the American West
American Civil War rifles
Rifles of the United States
Muzzleloaders
Early rifles